Filippo Giorgi (born February 9, 1959) is an Italian physicist and an author of 19 chapters and over 250 peer-reviewed articles which he published in such journals as Journal of Geophysical Research, Climate Dynamics and many others.

Biography
Giorgi was born in Sulmona, Italy. He got his bachelor's degree of science along with his master's from the University of L'Aquila in 1982 and four years later received his Ph.D. from Georgia Institute of Technology. From February to September 1982 he worked as research fellow at the IBM Scientific Center in Rome, Italy. From January 1983 to August 1984 he worked at his alma mater as a research assistant and had the same position at National Center for Atmospheric Research in Boulder, Colorado from same month of 1984 to June 1986. Later on, he became a postdoctoral fellow at the same place where he remained till October 1987. Beginning from the same month of the same year he became first scientist there and became second one by July 1991 which position he kept for three years.

He served at the National Center for Atmospheric Research from September 1992 to 1997. Between these years he was a visiting professor at the Joint Research Centre in Ispra for the whole year in 1993 and from July 1994 to April 1998 worked at his alma mater again, this time as third scientist. Since that year he worked as a senior scientist at the Abdus Salams' International Centre for Theoretical Physics in Trieste. From May 1998 till August 2005 he served as head of the Physics of Weather and Climate Group at the same place and from April 2002 till September 2008 was a vice-chair at the Intergovernmental Panel on Climate Change (IPCC), an organisation that was a co-recipient of the 2007 Nobel Peace Prize. As of September 2005 he is a head of the Earth System Physics Section of the International Centre for Theoretical
Physics.

Awards
In 1982 he became IBM research fellow and ten years later was nominated for the Outstanding Publication Award from the National Center for Atmospheric Research. In 2004 he was listed by the Institute for Scientific Information as a highly cited researcher and in 2008 he was awarded both the Dante Alighieri Prize from the Dante Alighieri Society and the same year became a recipient of the gold medal for Civic Merits from Province of L'Aquila.

In 2018 he received the Alexander von Humboldt Medal from the European Geosciences Union for outstanding research on modelling regional climate change.

References

1959 births
Living people
21st-century Italian physicists
Italian climatologists
Georgia Tech alumni
University of L'Aquila alumni
20th-century Italian physicists